Helen Coghlan is an  Australian magician living on the Gold Coast, Queensland.

Early life 
Helen is the daughter of Australian escapologist and magician Arthur Coghlan. She began her career in 1981. At the 19th Australian Convention of Magicians in 1984, she took home the first place trophy for junior magic.

Professional life 

Helen started working as a magician's assistant at the Magic Castle.

In 1987, she was the first woman in the world who completed for the first time the fear-inducing underwater act known as Houdini's Water Torture Escape, created by the legendary Harry Houdini.

Following in the footsteps of her father Arthur, Helen Coghlan performs astounding illusions created by Arthur on the television program Penn and Teller Fool Us.

In 2018, she appeared on the 5th season of Penn & Teller: Fool Us, where she successfully fooled Penn and Teller with a trick where she pushed a solid rod through a glass of milk.

She appeared on the show again in 2019 on the 6th season and fooled Penn and Teller once more.

In 2020, she appeared on the 7th season and became the first person to fool Penn & Teller three times on their show Fool Us.

Helen also appeared on the 8th season (2021). She performed in the episode "Penn & Teller's Worst Nightmare" on WCCB Charlotte's CW featuring magicians Jandro, Piff the Magic Dragon and Paul Gertner and fooled them again.

References

External links 

 Official website
 Twitter
 Instagram

Australian magicians
Living people
Escapologists
People from the Gold Coast, Queensland
Female magicians
Year of birth missing (living people)